Musa griersonii is a species of wild banana (genus Musa). It is endemic to Bhutan.

References

griersonii
Endemic flora of Bhutan